COCE is the name of a research project and stands for "Conservation and Use of Wild Populations of Coffea arabica in the Montane Rainforests of Ethiopia".

The project is financed by the German Ministry for Education and Research (BMBF) and carried out by the Center for Development Research, ZEF Bonn in Germany and with the Institute of Biodiversity Conservation and the Ethiopian Coffee Forest Forum in Ethiopia.

Background

The montane rain forests in southeast Ethiopia, the birthplace of wild Coffea arabica, were the origin of a large part of modern commercially used Coffea breeds. Due to the dwindling size of the montane rain forests as a result of clearing, the precious resource of wild Arabica coffee, and the genetic diversity it contains, is increasingly threatened.

Approximately 40% of Ethiopia's land area was covered by dense forests at the end of the 1960s.  This has now fallen to 2.7 percent. The former Kingdom of Kaffa in the southwest of the country is now a part of the Southern Nations, Nationalities and People's Region, one of the nine ethnic divisions of Ethiopia. The rapidly developing town of Bonga is the economic center of the Kaffa region. In the Kaffa region there are only 200,000 acres of undisturbed African montane rain forest remaining. However, these are extremely threatened in their existence, because of pressure on this forest region—due to the growing population, infrastructure projects such as road construction and investors plans—which has been increasing steadily.

List of key partner organizations 

 Bundesamt für Naturschutz (BfN), Bonn, Germany
 Bureau for Environmental and Ecological-economic Assessment (BETA), Wageningen, Netherlands
 Centre de Coopération Internationale en Recherche Agronomique pour le Développement (CIRAD), Montpellier, France
 Centro de Investigação das Ferrugens do Cafeeiro (CIFC), Oeiras, Portugal
 Department of Biology Education, University of Addis Ababa, Ethiopia
 Department of Biology, University Addis Abeba, Ethiopia
 Deutsche Gesellschaft für Technische Zusammenarbeit mbh (GTZ), Addis Ababa, Ethiopia / Eschborn, Germany
 EcoSecurities, Environmental Finance Solutions, Oxford, United Kingdom
 Ethiopian Coffee Forest Forum (ECFF), Addis Ababa, Ethiopia
 Ethiopian Economic Association (EEA), Addis Ababa, Ethiopia
 Ethiopian Institute for Agricultural Research (EIAR), Addis Ababa, Ethiopia
 Ethiopian Ministry of Agriculture and Rural Development, Addis Ababa, Ethiopia
 EU Coffee Improvement Program (CIP IV)
 Evolve – Consulting for Sustainable Development, Kirchzarten, Germany
 GEO schützt den Regenwald e. V., Hamburg, Germany
 Institute for Biodiversity Conservation (IBC), Addis Ababa, Ethiopia
 Institut für Nutzpflanzenwissenschaften und Ressourcenschutz (INRES), University of Bonn, Germany
 Institut für Pflanzenernährung, University of Bonn, Germany
 International Coffee Genome Network (ICGN), Montpellier, France
 Jima Agricultural Research Center, Ethiopian Institute for Agricultural Research (EIAR, former EARO), Jimma, Ethiopia
 Kraft Foods, Bremen, Germany
 Landwirtschaftlich-Gärtnerische Fakultät – Fachgebiet Ressourcenökonomie, Humboldt-Universität, Berlin, Germany
 Lernprozesse für nachhaltige Entwicklung, Wuppertal, Germany
 National Herbarium of Ethiopia, University of Addis Ababa, Ethiopia
 Nees Institut für Biodiversität der Pflanzen, University of Bonn, Germany
 Regional Coffee Producer Associations, Ethiopia
 Science Development, Wuppertal, Germany

Unannotated references
https://web.archive.org/web/20120727104914/http://www.coffee.uni-bonn.de/
http://www.geo.de/GEO/natur/oekologie/regenwaldverein/nachrichten/61313.html
http://ec.europa.eu/europeaid/tender/data/d18/AOF79818.pdf
http://www.evolve-sustainable-development.de/downloads/Certification%20options%20for%20Ethiopian%20wild%20forest%20coffee%20-%20CoCE%20Project%20report.pdf
https://web.archive.org/web/20131031102859/http://www.zef.de/367.html
http://www.ecff.org.et/component/content/article/10-yayu/6-yayu-coffee-forest-biosphere-reserve.html
https://web.archive.org/web/20160303220447/http://www.citeulike.org/user/klauso/article/12011979
http://www.biota-africa.org/spier_propfinal_detail_ba.php?ref_id=507&Page_ID=L975_13&PHPSESSID=btmse7ug8du88l97dbmt1s1692
http://www.tropentag.de/2010/abstracts/full/404.pdf
http://gadaa.com/OromoStudies/wp-content/uploads/2013/04/Wild-Arabica-Coffee-Populations-Under-Severe-Threat-Farmers-Perception-of-Existence-Access-to-and-Conservation-needs-in-the-Montane-Rainforests-Oromia-South.pdf

Nature conservation organisations based in Ethiopia
Coffee organizations
Agricultural organisations based in Germany